Rohrach is a river of Baden-Württemberg, Germany. It is a left tributary of the Eyb at Geislingen an der Steige.

See also
List of rivers of Baden-Württemberg

References 

Rivers of Baden-Württemberg
Rivers of Germany